Pink Floyd were considered pioneers in the live music experience for combining intense visual experiences with music to create a show in which the performers themselves were almost secondary. As well as visuals, Pink Floyd set standards in sound quality with innovative use of sound effects and panning quadrophonic speaker systems.

Special effects
Besides the music, an elaborate part to any Pink Floyd live show is the special effects.

The light show
Pink Floyd were among the first bands to use a dedicated travelling light show in conjunction with their performances. During the Barrett era, dynamic liquid light shows were projected onto enormous screens behind the band while they played, and the band also incorporated large numbers of strobe lights, which were controlled manually by an engineer. This had the effect of totally obscuring the band itself, except for their shadows, which Barrett took advantage of: he would hold his arms up during parts where he was not required to play, making his shadow grow, shrink and undulate, adding to the visual spectacle. They developed many of these lighting techniques through their early association with light artist Mike Leonard.

When psychedelia fell out of fashion from around 1970 onwards, elevated platforms of the type conventionally used for roof maintenance in high buildings were brought on tour and filled with lighting equipment to be raised and lowered during performances. Following Roger Waters' departure in 1985, the Pink Floyd light show reached a pinnacle. Marc Brickman, the group's lighting designer, utilized hundreds of automated intelligent lighting fixtures and lasers, which were state-of-the-art at the time. By the 1994 Division Bell tour, the band was using extremely powerful, isotope-splitting copper-vapour lasers. These gold-coloured lasers were worth over $120,000 a piece and previously had only been used in nuclear research and high speed photography.

A large circular projection panel dubbed "Mr Screen" first made an appearance during performances of Dark Side of the Moon in 1974 and became a staple thereafter. The high quality, extreme wide angle projection required special high-speed, 35mm, 10,000 watt xenon film projectors, with  custom lenses, all designed, built and toured by Associates & Ferren. Specially recorded films and animations were projected onto it, and for 1977 "In the Flesh" and 1980–1981 "The Wall Live" tours, coloured spotlights were fixed around the rim, an effect which reached its zenith with the dancing patterns of multi-coloured lights in the A Momentary Lapse of Reason and Division Bell tours. In the latter, the screen could be retracted behind the stage when not required, and was tilted horizontally with its peripheral lights focused onto the stage into a single spotlight during the final guitar solo in "Comfortably Numb".

Several generations of giant glitter balls began with the Dark Side of the Moon tour. By the Division Bell tour, the ball had evolved into a globe 4.9 metres in diameter, which rose from the mixing station to a height of 21.3 metres before opening into an array of petals 7.3 metres wide during the final guitar solo of "Comfortably Numb", revealing a 12 kilowatt Phobeus HMI lamp inside.

Props and pyrotechnics
Pyrotechnics (such as exploding flashpots, an exploding gong and fireworks) and dry ice were used extensively throughout Pink Floyd's career. In 1973's tour to promote The Dark Side of the Moon, a large scale model plane flew over the audience and crashed onto the stage with a spectacular explosion, an effect repeated at the start of The Wall and the Division Bell shows. During shows to promote A Momentary Lapse of Reason, a similar effect was achieved with a flying bed.

Oversized helium balloons were first introduced during the Dark Side of the Moon tours, but in 1975, this element began to play a central part of the live show. For the U.S. leg of the 1975 tour, a pyramid shaped dirigible was floated above the stage. It proved unstable in windy conditions and blew into the crowd, which tore it into pieces for souvenirs. The trademark giant pig was brought in for Animals in 1977, floating over the audience, as well as a grotesque 'Nuclear Family', a refrigerator filled with snakes, a television and a Cadillac. In some shows, an envelope of propane gas was put inside the pig, causing it to explode. The inflatables reached their peak in 1980–1981 during The Wall shows, in which several of the characters from the album were brought to life in the form of fully mobile, giant string puppets with menacing spotlights for eyes, taking the traditional balloons to a new level. The characters were designed by the notable satirical artist, Gerald Scarfe.

Special effects reached a new and outrageous level during these Wall shows. The final brick was placed as Roger Waters sang "goodbye" at the end of the song "Goodbye Cruel World." For the second half of the show, the band was largely invisible, except for a hole in the wall that simulated a hotel room where Roger Waters "acted out" the story of Pink, and an appearance by David Gilmour on top of the wall to perform the climactic guitar solo in "Comfortably Numb." Other parts of the story were told by Gerald Scarfe animations projected onto the wall itself (these animations were later integrated into the film Pink Floyd: The Wall). At the finale of the concert, the wall was demolished amidst sound effects and a spectacular light show.

Major tours and concerts
30 September 1966 – The All Saints Church Hall Concert - London Free School/International Times Benefit Show
29–30 April 1967 – The 14 Hour Technicolour Dream concerts
12 May 1967 – Games for May concert
4–12 November 1967 – First US Tour
29 June 1968 – Midsummer High Weekend concert
February – December 1968 – Pink Floyd World Tour 1968
May – September 1969 – The Man and The Journey Tour
27 June 1970 – The Bath Festival of Blues and Progressive Music concert
28 June 1970 - The Holland Pop Festival in Kralingen Rotterdam
September 1970 – October 1971 – Atom Heart Mother World Tour
October – November 1971 – Meddle Tour
January 1972 – November 1973 – Dark Side of the Moon Tour
June 1974 – French Summer Tour
November – December 1974 – British Winter Tour
April – July 1975 – Wish You Were Here Tour
January – July 1977 – In the Flesh Tour
February 1980 – June 1981 – The Wall Tour (Is There Anybody Out There? The Wall Live 1980–81)
September 1987 – August 1988 – A Momentary Lapse of Reason Tour (as documented by Delicate Sound of Thunder)
May 1989 – July 1989 – Another Lapse Tour
30 June 1990 – Knebworth Festival concert
18 September 1993 – Cowdray Ruins concert
March - October 1994 – The Division Bell Tour (as documented by Pulse)
17 January 1996 – Rock and Roll Hall of Fame performance
2 July 2005 – Live 8 concert
10 May 2007 – Syd Barrett Tribute concert

Performance history highlights

Barrett era
The earliest shows for what is considered to be "Pink Floyd" occurred in 1965 and included Bob Klose as a member of the band, which at the time played mainly R&B covers. Klose left the band after 1965. The remaining four members played very small (generally no more than 50 people), mostly unadvertised shows at the Marquee Club in London through June 1966. The set list continued to include R&B, but some original psychedelia was also being introduced.

On 30 September 1966, Pink Floyd were invited to play All Saint's Church Hall to raise money for the nascent International Times newspaper, and quickly became the "house band". At these shows, the band began its use of visual effects and gradually stopped covering R&B.  Word of these shows quickly spread in the London underground culture and soon the band became very well-attended and developed a cult following. On 23 December 1966, the first of the "International Times" associated gigs to be held at the UFO Club was performed.  Mainstream interest about the counter-culture was increasing and a very small portion of their 20 January 1967 show at the UFO Club was broadcast as part of Granada TV's documentary entitled It's So Far Out, It's Straight Down, which constitutes the first audial or visual record of the band live.

Pink Floyd were among the 30 bands that played The 14 Hour Technicolour Dream benefit gig organised for the "International Times" legal defence fund and held at the Alexandra Palace in London on the eve of 30 April 1967. Some of the other bands who played were The Who, The Move, The Pretty Things, Soft Machine, Tomorrow and The Creation. Notables in attendance included musician John Lennon, artist John Dunbar, actor Michael Caine, artist and musician Yoko Ono, actress Julie Christie, musician Mick Jagger and artist David Hockney. Although both the BBC and filmmaker Peter Whitehead filmed portions of the event, there is no known footage of Pink Floyd.

On 12 May 1967, Pink Floyd performed at Queen Elizabeth Hall in London a concert entitled Games for May. At this show, they debuted a multi-speaker pan pot system controlled by joystick from the stage that allowed them to move sound to anywhere a speaker had been set up. This precursor to their later "Azimuth Coordinator" unfortunately was stolen after the show.

After their debut single, "Arnold Layne", charted well in the UK, the band was invited to perform on the BBC2 music show The Look of the Week on 14 May 1967. The setlist for the broadcast consisted of "Pow R. Toc H." and "Astronomy Domine". This was their first British television appearance.

Pink Floyd were invited to appear on the BBC2 music show Top of the Pops in July 1967 for three weeks after their second single "See Emily Play" reached No. 6 on the UK charts.  By this time Syd Barrett's behavior had become somewhat unpredictable. On one occasion, the increasingly difficult Barrett remarked that if John Lennon did not have to appear on Top of the Pops neither did he. Consequently, their management company, Blackhill Enterprises, convinced the band to cancel all of their August shows and go to Spain to recuperate.

Increasingly, throughout the summer and into the fall of 1967, copious drug use (especially LSD) and pressure by the record company to constantly write new hit songs continued to take a toll on Barrett's mental state. He became unable to make a meaningful contribution to the group on stage, playing his guitar incoherently and sometimes not playing at all. By the time of the band's first tour of the US in early November 1967, his condition was plainly showing. He stared blankly into space on their 4 November American Bandstand performance, listlessly strummed and barely managed to mime the vocals to "Apples and Oranges". On 5 November, things got worse: they appeared on The Pat Boone Show and Barrett sat in stubborn silence, refusing to answer any question put to him. He also refused to mime to "See Emily Play": Waters was forced to mime the track instead (Waters confirmed this on the VH1's Legends: Pink Floyd episode). After 22 December show, the rest of band quietly put out word that they were in need of a guitarist.

Although both Jeff Beck and Davy O'List were considered, it was David Gilmour, then unobligated, who was brought on to augment Barrett as need arose during live shows. For the first four shows of 1968, Pink Floyd was a five-man live act again. When they were on the way to their show at Southampton University on 26 January 1968, they decided not to pick up Barrett.

Transition and experimentation
See: Pink Floyd World Tour 1968

A typical 1968 set list would include some of the following:
"Astronomy Domine"
"Interstellar Overdrive"
"Set the Controls for the Heart of the Sun"
"Pow R. Toc H."
"Let There Be More Light"
"The Massed Gadgets of Hercules" (first performed on 23 May 1968, renamed "A Saucerful of Secrets" )
"Flaming"
"Keep Smiling People" (a prototype version of "Careful with That Axe, Eugene")

Although their management company Blackhill Enterprises parted ways with them over their decision about Syd Barrett on 29 June 1968, Pink Floyd headlined the first free Hyde Park concert organized by Blackhill. Others performing were Tyrannosaurus Rex, Roy Harper and Jethro Tull.

A second tour of the US during July and August 1968 (see A Saucerful of Secrets US Tour) was launched to tie into the release of their second album, A Saucerful of Secrets. Increasingly throughout 1968 and 1969, shows consisted of post-Barrett compositions, with notable exceptions being "Astronomy Domine" and "Interstellar Overdrive", both of which were performed into the 1970s.  Their audiences changed during this time as well: while Barrett-era crowds consisted mainly of hippies who would dance in time with the music, they now drew more "intellectual" crowd,  who would sit and remain quiet until the last note of a song was played. By early 1969, most of their excess earnings were funneled into upgrading their sound equipment rather than maintaining a permanent light show.  If visuals were to be used at all, they had to be provided by the venue or the local promoter.

A typical 1969 set list would include some of the following:

See: The Man And The Journey Tour

"The Man/The Journey"
"Astronomy Domine"
"Interstellar Overdrive"
"Set the Controls for the Heart of the Sun"
"Pow R. Toc H."
"Let There Be More Light"
"A Saucerful of Secrets"
"Cymbaline"
"Green is the Colour"
"Main Theme" (rarely played)
"Careful with That Axe, Eugene"

The shows at Mothers, Birmingham on 27 April 1969 and the College of Commerce, Manchester on 2 May 1969 were recorded for the live part of the Ummagumma album.  One source also claims that the show at Bromley Technical College on 26 April 1969 was also recorded for the album.

On 14 April 1969, at Royal Festival Hall, they debuted their new pan pot 360 degree sound system dubbed the "Azimuth Coordinator". This show, named "More Furious Madness from the Massed Gadgets of Auximenes", consisted of two experimental "suites", "The Man" and "The Journey". Most of the songs were either renamed earlier material or under a different name than they would eventually be released.

A UK tour of occurred during May and June 1969 culminating in the show dubbed "The Final Lunacy" at Royal Albert Hall on 26 June 1969. Considered one of the most experimental concerts by Pink Floyd, it featured a crew member dressed as a gorilla, a cannon that fired, and band members sawing wood on the stage. At the finale of "The Journey" suite the band was joined on stage by the brass section of the Royal Philharmonic Orchestra and the ladies of the Ealing Central Amateur Choir, and at the very end a huge pink smoke bomb was let off.

An additional complete performance of "The Man/The Journey" occurred at the Concertgebouw, Amsterdam on 17 September and was taped and later broadcast by Dutch radio station Hilversum 3. Portions of the suites were being performed as late as early 1970.

The "Atom Heart Mother" era
A typical 1970 set list would include some of the following:
"Astronomy Domine"
"Interstellar Overdrive"
"Set the Controls for the Heart of the Sun"
"A Saucerful of Secrets"
"Cymbaline"
"Green is the Colour"
"Main Theme"  (rarely played, and only in early 1970)
"Careful with That Axe, Eugene"
"Sysyphus" pts. 1-4  (rarely played, and only in early 1970)
"Grantchester Meadows"
"Embryo"
"The Violent Sequence"  (rarely played, and only in early 1970)
"Heart Beat, Pig Meat" performed at Manchester Opera House 8 February 1970
"Atom Heart Mother"
"Fat Old Sun"  (beginning in September)
"Alan's Psychedelic Breakfast"  (only played a few times in December)

Early in 1970, Pink Floyd performed at gigs a piece from their film soundtrack for Michelangelo Antonioni's film Zabriskie Point referred to as "The Violent Sequence".  This was the musical basis for "Us and Them", from their The Dark Side of the Moon album. Lacking only the lyrics, it is identical to the final song and is the earliest part of the seminal album to have been performed live. The song "Embryo" was also a part of the live repertoire around this time, but was never to appear on a studio album, until the compilation album Works.

On 18 January 1970 (possibly 17 January 1970), the band began performing a then untitled instrumental piece, which would eventually become the title track to their next album Atom Heart Mother. At this point, it had no orchestra or choir accompaniment. The song officially debuted at the Bath Festival, Somerset England on 27 June 1970 under the title "The Amazing Pudding" (later the name of a Pink Floyd fanzine) and for the first time with orchestra and choir accompaniment.

Announced as "The Atom Heart Mother" by the British broadcaster John Peel on his BBC Radio 1 show "Peel's Sunday Concert" on 16 July 1970, a name suggested by him to the band, it was also announced as "The Atomic Heart Mother" two days later at the Hyde Park free concert.  Partly because of the difficulties of finding and hiring local orchestras and choirs, the band often played what is referred to as the "small band" version of the song when they performed it live.

On 28 June 1970 Fink Floyd was the end-performance of the Kralingen Music Festival or "Stamping Ground" in a park near Rotterdam, The Netherlands.

On 18 July Pink Floyd headlined a free concert in Hyde Park organised by Blackhill Enterprises. They closed the show with Atom Heart Mother, which had been given the name after Roger Waters read an article in a newspaper about a woman who had been given a prototype heart pacemaker

Pink Floyd also appeared at a Free festival In Canterbury on 31 August which was filmed. This was the end leg of the Medicine Ball Caravan tour organised by Warner Brothers, which was later made into a film of the same name. It appears that the Pink Floyd footage was not included in the movie but spectators report that Atom Heart Mother was part of the set that was recorded. The audience must have been one of the smallest to see Pink Floyd at this era, only 1500 were present as the festival was not widely promoted.

In contrast, over 500,000 people witnessed their show at Fête de L'Humanité, Paris on 12 September 1970, their largest crowd ever. Filmed by French TV, the show was never broadcast.

Experimental on the album Atom Heart Mother, the song "Alan's Psychedelic Breakfast" was performed at a few gigs in December 1970. "Breakfast" being made was part of the song. The first part of this lasted around four minutes. The second part of "breakfast" preparation was around a minute followed by a 3-minute tape of British DJ Jimmy Young, whom the band disliked.

For a great recording of some of their material from this period check out the Fillmore West show in San Francisco, California on 29 April 1970 on Wolfgang's Vault. This show includes material from Ummagumma and Atom Heart Mother.

Early performances of "Echoes"
A typical 1971 set list would include some of the following:
"Astronomy Domine"  (dropped from the setlist in June)
"Interstellar Overdrive"  (dropped from the setlist in November 1970)
"Set the Controls for the Heart of the Sun"
"A Saucerful of Secrets"
"Cymbaline"
"Green Is the Colour"  (dropped from the setlist in August)
"Careful with That Axe, Eugene"
"Embryo"
"Atom Heart Mother"
"Fat Old Sun"
"Echoes"
"One of These Days"  (beginning in late September / early October)

January 1971 saw the band working on a track in the studio of then unconnected parts whose working title was either "Nothing — Parts 1 to 24" or "Nothing Parts 1–36". This song made its live debut under the working title "Return of the Son of Nothing" on 22 April 1971 at Norwich, England and like "Atom Heart Mother" before it, it was a work in progress. This was later to be released as "Echoes" on the album Meddle.

Although announced as "Echoes" on 6 August 1971 at Hakone, Japan, the song was still performed with the additional lyrics at later August gigs. The show on 18 September 1971 at Montreux, Switzerland and subsequent shows do not have the additional lyrics. In 1972, during a German tour, Waters sardonically introduced Echoes as "Looking Through the Knotholes in Granny's Wooden Leg" (a Goon Show reference) on one occasion and "The March of the Dam Busters" on another. On another occasion, during a live radio broadcast, Waters had instructed compére John Peel to announce "One of These Days" to the home audience as "A poignant appraisal of the contemporary social situation."

After the band's Crystal Palace Garden Party performance (London, 15 May 1971), it was discovered that the use of fireworks caused some fishes to die, in a pond directly in front of the stage. The band was subsequently pressured to compensate for the damage.

Eclipse - A Piece for Assorted Lunatics

A typical 1972 set list included:

First Set:
 "Breathe in the Air"
 "The Travel Sequence"
 "Time"
 "Home Again"
 "The Mortality Sequence" (aka "Religion")
 "Money"
 "The Violent Sequence"
 "Scat"
 "Lunatic"
 "Eclipse"

Second Set:
"One of These Days"
"Set the Controls for the Heart of the Sun"  (or as an encore)
"Careful with That Axe, Eugene"  (or as an encore)
"Echoes"  (or as an encore)
"Atom Heart Mother"  (rarely, last performance on 22 May 1972)
"A Saucerful of Secrets"  (rarely in second set, usually as an encore)
"Childhood's End"  (rarely, introduced in November 1972)

Encore:
Rotated one of these three songs:
"A Saucerful of Secrets"  (last performance on 23 September 1972)
"Set the Controls for the Heart of the Sun"  (or in second set)
"Echoes"  (or in second set)
Occasionally, multiple song encores were performed, adding:
 "Blues"

Playing 98 shows (the most until 1994), 1972 was the last time Pink Floyd varied their set lists each night on a tour until their final one.  Songs played in the second set and encore were swapped constantly, and the band even varied the number of songs played in the encore from the usual one, to two or three.

1972 saw Pink Floyd debut the performance of a not just a song (like on previous tours), but an entire album prior to its release. The original title was Eclipse (A Piece for Assorted Lunatics), then The Dark Side of the Moon - A Piece for Assorted Lunatics, the name under which it made its press debut in February 1972 at London's Rainbow Theatre. The title changed for the first part of the US tour to Eclipse (A Piece for Assorted Lunatics) during April and May before reverting to Dark Side of the Moon - A Piece for Assorted Lunatics in September for the second part of the US tour and finally released in 1973 under the title of Dark Side of the Moon.

One of the two shows at The Dome, Brighton, England on 28 June and 29 June was filmed by Peter Clifton for inclusion on his film Sounds of the City. Clips of these appear occasionally on television and the performance of "Careful with That Axe, Eugene" is on the various artists video Superstars in Concert.

In November 1972, during the middle of the European leg of their 1972 world tour and again in January 1973, Pink Floyd performed with the Roland Petit Ballet. The portion of the setlist for which the ballet was choreographed was "One of These Days", "Careful with That Axe, Eugene", "Obscured by Clouds", "When You're In" and "Echoes".

Dark Side of the Moon

An early 1973 set list (until mid-March) included:

First Set:
"Echoes"
"Obscured by Clouds"/"When You're In" (The two songs incorporated into a longer piece with a jamming guitar & keyboard section in the middle)
"Childhood's End" (rarely)
"Careful with That Axe, Eugene"
Second Set:
The Dark Side of the Moon entire album
Encore:
"One of These Days"

For remainder of 1973 (except 4 November), the set list included:

First Set:
"Obscured by Clouds"
"When You're In"
"Set the Controls for the Heart of the Sun"
"Careful with That Axe, Eugene"
"Echoes"
Second Set: 
The Dark Side of the Moon entire album
Encore:
"One of These Days"

In 1973, the band moved Dark Side of the Moon to the second set (where it would reside through 1975), and played the album version of the piece, notably the revamped versions of "On the Run" and "The Great Gig in the Sky."  1973 saw Pink Floyd go on two relatively short tours of the US, one in March to coincide with the release of The Dark Side of the Moon and a later one in June. Sandwiched between them were two nights at London's Earl's Court on 18 May and 19 May where they debuted the special effect of a plane crashing into the stage at the end of the song "On the Run".  This was also the first year that the band took additional musicians on tour with them, unlike the earlier performances of "Atom Heart Mother" where the band would often hire local musicians.

Because of the overwhelming chart success of both The Dark Side of the Moon, which reached No. 1 in the US in late April, No. 2 in the UK, and the US-released single "Money", the nature of Pink Floyd's audiences changed in June 1973. David Gilmour said of the change "It was 'Money' that made the difference rather than 'The Dark Side of the Moon'.  It gave us a much larger following, for which we should be thankful. ... People at the front shouting, 'Play Money! Gimme something I can shake my ass to!' We had to get used to it, but previously we'd been playing to 10,000 seaters where, in the quiet passages, you could hear a pin drop."  They could now sell out stadiums.

On 4 November 1973, Pink Floyd played two shows at London's Rainbow Theatre to benefit musician Robert Wyatt formerly the drummer of Soft Machine, a band they'd played with in their UFO Club days. Wyatt fell from a fourth floor window in June 1973, breaking his back and making him a paraplegic.  The set list for these two shows were:

Main Set:
The Dark Side of the Moon entire album
Encore:
"Obscured by Clouds"
"When You're In"

1974 Tours

A French Summer Tour set list would include all of the following:
"Raving and Drooling"
"Shine On You Crazy Diamond"
"Echoes"
The Dark Side of the Moon (Entire album)
Encore (one of the following):
"Careful with That Axe, Eugene"
"One of These Days"

A British Winter Tour set list included all of the following:
"Shine On You Crazy Diamond"
"Raving and Drooling"
"You've Got to be Crazy"
The Dark Side of the Moon (Entire album)
Encore:
"Echoes"

These early versions of "Shine On You Crazy Diamond", "Raving and Drooling" & "You've Got to be Crazy" were released as part of the Wish You Were Here Experience and Immersion sets.

1975 North America Tour & Knebworth '75

A typical 1975 set would include all of the following:

"Shine On You Crazy Diamond (Parts I-V)"
"Have a Cigar"
"Shine On You Crazy Diamond (Parts VI-IX)"
"Raving and Drooling"
"You've Got to be Crazy"
The Dark Side of the Moon (entire album)
Encore:
"Echoes"

In 1975, the band launched a short tour that ended two months prior to the release of Wish You Were Here, which eventually sold out stadiums and arenas across America.

The last gig of the tour was as the headliner of 1975 Knebworth Festival, which also featured The Steve Miller Band, Captain Beefheart and Roy Harper (who joined Pink Floyd on the stage to sing "Have a Cigar"). It was the second Knebworth Festival, which featured artists such as The Rolling Stones, Led Zeppelin, Genesis and Frank Zappa between 1974 and 1979.

Despite some technical problems, the band managed to perform a remarkable concert, which as well as the usual special effects featured a fly-past by a pair of Spitfires. This was supposed to synchronise with the start of 'Breathe' but the band had tuning difficulties and the planes flew over before the start of the set. Knebworth was the last time the band would perform "Echoes" and the entire Dark Side of the Moon with Roger Waters.

In the Flesh

A typical 1977 set list would include the following:
Animals (entire album)
Wish You Were Here (entire album)
Encore:
"Money"
"Us and Them"
"Careful with That Axe, Eugene" (performed once in Oakland, California)
"More Blues" (performed once in Montreal, Quebec, Canada)

In 1977, Pink Floyd embarked on a world tour in support of the "Animals" album. Although the album had not sold as well as their two previous releases, "Dark Side Of The Moon" and "Wish You Were Here", the band's popularity was at an all-time high. The band managed to sell out arenas and stadiums in both Europe and America, setting attendance records all along the way. In Chicago, the band played to an estimated audience of 95,000; in Cleveland and Montreal, they set attendance records for those venues by playing to over 80,000 people. The "In The Flesh" tour would later become widely known as their most memorable series of concert performances, and the last in which Roger Waters would accompany the band. The elaborate stage presentations, particularly those constructed for the outdoor venues, were their most complex and elaborate to date. Designed by Mark Fisher and Andrew Sanders, they featured a pyrotechnic "waterfall", umbrella-like canopies that could be deployed to protect the band from the elements, and a variety of characters associated with the "Animals" album; including "Algie", a 40-foot long inflatable pig that drifted out over the audience, the "Average American family" (which, at the time, included Mom, Dad and 2.5 children), and paper sheep that parachuted down on the crowds after being shot from cannons mounted to the sides of the stage. The musicians that accompanied the band on the tour included veteran saxophone player Dick Parry (occasionally playing keyboards as well) and guitarist Snowy White, who also filled in on bass guitar for some songs.

In the first half of each show, the band played all of the songs from Animals, but in a slightly different sequence than the album (typically starting with "Sheep", then "Pigs On the Wing (Part 1)", "Dogs", "Pigs On the Wing (Part 2)" and "Pigs (Three Different Ones)").  The second half of the shows consisted of Wish You Were Here being played in its exact running order ("Shine On You Crazy Diamond (Parts 1-5)", "Welcome to the Machine", "Have a Cigar", "Wish You Were Here" and "Shine On You Crazy Diamond (Parts 6-9)"). The encores would usually consist of either "Money" or "Us and Them" from Dark Side of the Moon or both. At the Oakland, California show on May 9, they played "Careful with That Axe, Eugene" as a third encore, the last time the song was ever performed live.

The tour started in Dortmund, West Germany on 23 January and proceeded through Europe, ending in Stafford, England on 31 March. Three weeks later, the North American leg of the tour opened in Miami, Florida on 22 April, concluding in Montreal, Quebec on 6 July. The show in Oakland, California on 9 May is widely regarded as one of the band's finest performances ever. During "Have a Cigar," Waters and Gilmour can be heard laughing as they sing part of the opening line. In the run-up to the band's four-night run at Madison Square Garden in New York City (1–4 July), tour promoters used an aggressive marketing strategy, filling pages of The New York Times and Billboard magazine with ads. In May, there was a Pink Floyd parade on 6th Avenue featuring both inflatable and live animals.

Another memorable performance occurred in Cleveland, Ohio on 25 June. The show was held at Cleveland Municipal Stadium, just a short distance from Burke Lakefront Airport. Most of the shows opened with a recording of jet airplane taking off, but promoters secretly arranged for the band's Boeing 737 jet to do a low flyover directly over the stadium as the show opened. The FAA later fined the promoters $1,500 over the incident. The show was also delayed briefly by a fan that grabbed the tether line for the inflatable pig and wouldn't release it. At their performance in Boston two nights later, Waters jokingly said "We're going to take a PIG break, back in 20 minutes". He closed the show by gratefully commenting that this had been "the perfect end to the perfect day, good night and God bless".

As the tour began, everyone was in good spirits, but the later shows were marred by Roger Waters' increasing annoyance with the raucous fans in attendance. During the last show in Montreal, a noisy fan near the stage irritated Waters to such an extent that he spat on him. The act so disgusted David Gilmour that he left the stage prior to the final encore, ""More Blues"", leaving Snowy White to fill in as the roadies began dismantling the stage equipment. The insatiable audience clamored for the band to keep playing, and a small riot broke out in front of the stage following the band's eventual exit. Later that night, Waters recounted the incident to his friend, music producer Bob Ezrin, and expressed his growing feelings of alienation toward their fans. Those feeling of detachment became the starting and focal point for Pink Floyd's next album, The Wall.

The Wall live

The 1980/1981 set lists comprised the entire album, The Wall.

Pink Floyd mounted its most elaborate stage show in conjunction with the tour of The Wall. A band of session musicians played the first song, wearing rubber face masks taken from the real band members, then backed up the band for the remainder of the show. Most notable was the giant wall constructed between band and audience.

The costs of the tour were estimated to have reached US$1.5 million even before the first performance. The New York Times stated in its 2 March 1980 edition that:

The 'Wall' show remains a milestone in rock history though and there's no point in denying it. Never again will one be able to accept the technical clumsiness, distorted sound and meagre visuals of most arena rock concerts as inevitable" and concluded that "the 'Wall' show will be the touchstone against which all future rock spectacles must be measured. The show was designed by Mark Fisher with Art Direction by Gerald Scarfe.

The Wall concert was only performed a handful of times each in four cities: Los Angeles, Uniondale (Long Island), Dortmund, and London (at Earl's Court). The primary 'tour' occurred in 1980, but the band performed eight shows at Dortmund (14–20 February 1981) and five more shows at Earl's Court (13–17 June) for filming, with the intention of integrating the shows into the upcoming movie. The resulting footage was deemed substandard and scrapped; years later, Roger Waters has given conflicted answers on the status of the concert films stating from "trying to locate this footage for historical purposes but was unsuccessful and considers it to be lost forever" to "I have all of the film but am reluctant to release". There are several unofficial videos of the entire live show in circulation and some footage is shown on the Behind the Wall documentary.

Gilmour and Mason attempted to convince Waters to expand the show for a more lucrative, large-scale stadium tour, but because of the nature of the material (one of the primary themes is the distance between an artist and his audience) Waters balked at this. In fact, Waters had reportedly been offered a guaranteed US$1 million for each additional stadium concert, but declined the offer, insisting that such a tour would be hypocritical.

These shows are documented on the album Is There Anybody Out There? The Wall Live 1980-81.

Waters recreated the Wall show in Berlin in 1990, alongside the ruins of the Berlin Wall, and was joined by a number of guest artists (including Bryan Adams, Scorpions, Van Morrison, The Band, Tim Curry, Cyndi Lauper, Sinéad O'Connor, Marianne Faithfull, Joni Mitchell, Ute Lemper and Thomas Dolby). The size of the theatrical features of The Wall were increased to cater for a sold-out audience of 200,000 people and of another estimated 500 million, in 35 countries, watching on television. After the concert began, the gates were opened and an estimated 300,000 to 500,000 people were able to watch the concert. This show is available on The Wall Live in Berlin album and DVD.

Roger staged another tour of The Wall  in 2010 saying of the story "it has occurred to me that maybe the story of my fear and loss with its concomitant inevitable residue of ridicule, shame and punishment, provides an allegory for broader concerns.: Nationalism, racism, sexism, religion, Whatever!  All these issues and ‘isms are driven by the same fears that drove my young life."

A Momentary Lapse of Reason

After the release of A Momentary Lapse of Reason in 1987, Pink Floyd embarked on an 11-week tour to promote the album. The two remaining members of the band, David Gilmour and Nick Mason, along with Richard Wright, had just won a legal battle against Roger Waters and the future of the group was uncertain. Having the success of The Wall shows to live up to, the concerts' special effects were more impressive than ever. The initial "promotional tour" was extended, and finally lasted almost two years, ending in 1989 after playing around 200 concerts to about 5.5 million people in total, including 3 dates at Madison Square Garden (5–7 October 1987) and 2 nights at Wembley Stadium (5–6 August 1988). The tour took Pink Floyd to various exotic locations they had never played before such as shows in the forecourt of the Palace of Versailles, Moscow's Olympic Stadium, and Venice, despite fears and protests that the sound would damage the latter city's foundations.

These shows are documented by the Delicate Sound of Thunder album and video.

Pink Floyd was the second highest grossing act of 1987 and the highest grossing of 1988 in the U.S. Financially, Pink Floyd was the biggest act of these two years combined, grossing almost US$60 million from touring, about the same as U2 and Michael Jackson, their closest rivals, combined. Worldwide, the band grossed around US$135 million.

The tour marked the first time that the band played in Russia, Norway, Spain, New Zealand and was the first time they had played in Australia since 1973.

A further concert was held at the Knebworth Festival in 1990, a charity event that also featured other Silver Clef Award winners. Pink Floyd was the last act to play, to an audience of 125,000. During this gig Clare Torry sang backing vocals making it the second and last time she did so. Vicki and Sam Brown also attended as backing vocalists, as well as Candy Dulfer with saxophone solo. The £60,000 firework display that ended the concert was entirely financed by the band.

The Division Bell

The Division Bell Tour in 1994 was promoted by Canadian concert impresario Michael Cohl and became the highest-grossing tour in rock music history to that date, with the band playing the entirety of The Dark Side of the Moon in some shows, for the first time since 1975.

The concerts featured more elaborate special effects than the previous tour, including two custom designed airships. The arch-shaped stage was designed by Marc Brickman and Mark Fisher with lighting by Marc Brickman. All in all, the tour required 700 tons of steel carried by 53 articulated trucks, a crew of 161 people and an initial investment of US$4 million plus US$25 million of running costs just to stage. This tour played to 5.5 million people in 68 cities; each concert gathered an average 45,000 audience. At the end of the year, the Division Bell Tour was announced as the biggest tour ever, with worldwide gross of over £150 million (about US$250 million). In the U.S. alone, it grossed US$103.5 million from 59 concerts. However, this record was short-lived; less than a year later, The Rolling Stones' Voodoo Lounge Tour (like the Division Bell Tour, also sponsored in part by Volkswagen) finished with a worldwide gross of over US$300 million. The Stones and U2 (with their Vertigo Tour) remain the only acts ever to achieve a higher worldwide gross from a tour, even when adjusting for inflation.

These shows are documented by the Pulse album and Pulse (1995 film).

Post-Pulse era

1996: Rock and Roll Hall of Fame performance 
In 1996, Gilmour and Wright performed "Wish You Were Here" with Billy Corgan (of The Smashing Pumpkins fame) at their Rock and Roll Hall of Fame induction.

2001: David Gilmour & Nick Mason statements about Pink Floyd touring again in the future 
In an interview with BBC Radio 2 in October, 2001, Gilmour implied that the Echoes: The Best of Pink Floyd  compilation (released in November 2001) "probably" signaled the end of the band. "You never know exactly what the future (holds)", Gilmour said. "I'm not going to slam any doors too firmly, but I don't see myself doing any more of that, and I certainly don't see myself going out on a big Floyd tour again." A few days later in an interview with Launch.com, Nick Mason contradicted the statement, saying "I don't feel I've retired yet. You know, if everyone wanted to, we could certainly still do something. I've spent 30 years waiting for the planets to align. I'm quite used to it."

2002: David Gilmour in Concert DVD release 
David Gilmour released a solo concert DVD called David Gilmour in Concert in November 2002 which was compiled from shows on 22 June 2001 and 17 January 2002 at The Royal Festival Hall in London. Richard Wright, Robert Wyatt, and Bob Geldof (Pink in The Wall film) make guest appearances.

2003: Steve O'Rourke's funeral performance 
Longtime manager Steve O'Rourke died on 30 October 2003. Gilmour, Mason and Wright performed "Fat Old Sun" and "The Great Gig in the Sky" at his funeral at Chichester Cathedral, contrary to reports in the media claiming they played "Wish You Were Here".

2005: Live 8 performance 
On 2 July 2005 Pink Floyd performed at the London Live 8 concert with Roger Waters rejoining David Gilmour, Nick Mason and Richard Wright. It was the quartet's first performance together in over 24 years — the band's last show with Waters was at Earls Court in London on 17 June 1981.

Gilmour announced the Live 8 reunion on 12 June 2005:

The band's set consisted of "Speak to Me/Breathe/Breathe (Reprise)", "Money", "Wish You Were Here", and "Comfortably Numb". This is the only known occurrence when Pink Floyd played "Breathe" and "Breathe (Reprise)" together as a single piece. As on the original recordings, Gilmour sang the lead vocals on "Breathe" and "Money", and shared them with Waters on "Comfortably Numb".  For "Wish You Were Here", Waters sung half of the verse's lyrics, unlike the original recording. When Waters was not singing, he was often enthusiastically mouthing the lyrics off-microphone. During the guitar introduction of "Wish You Were Here", Waters said:

They were augmented by guitarist/bassist Tim Renwick (guitarist on Roger Waters' 1984 solo tour, who has since become Pink Floyd's backing guitarist on stage); keyboardist/lap steel guitarist/backup vocalist Jon Carin (Pink Floyd's backing keyboardist from 1987 onward who performed on the 1999–2000 North American leg of Waters' "In the Flesh" tour, his 2006–2008 "Dark Side of the Moon Live" tour, his 2010–2011 "The Wall" tour and David Gilmour's 2006 On an Island tour); saxophonist Dick Parry during "Money" (who played on the original recordings of "Money", "Us and Them", and "Shine on You Crazy Diamond"); and backing singer Carol Kenyon during "Comfortably Numb". During "Breathe", on the screen behind them, film of the iconic pig from the Animals album was shown flying over Battersea Power Station (itself visible on the horizon in television broadcasts of the performance), and during "Money", a shot of The Dark Side of the Moon record being played was shown. During "Comfortably Numb", the three giant screens showed the Pink Floyd Wall (from the cover of The Wall), and during the final guitar solo, the words "Make Poverty History" were written on the wall.

At the end, after the last song had been played, Gilmour said "thank you very much, good night" and started to walk off the stage. Waters called him back, however, and the band shared a group hug that became one of the most famous pictures of Live 8. As they proceeded to walk off, Nick Mason threw his drumsticks into the audience. With Wright's subsequent death, in September 2008, this was to be the final concert to feature all four bandmates playing together.

2007: Syd Barrett tribute concert 
On 10 May 2007 Pink Floyd (Wright, Gilmour and Mason), joined by Andy Bell of Oasis on bass and Jon Carin on keys, performed at London's Barbican Centre as part of "The Madcap's Last Laugh", a tribute concert for Syd Barrett who had died the previous year. They played "Arnold Layne", and later joined other artists to perform "Bike". This would be the last time Wright appeared as part of Pink Floyd, before his own death the following year.

Roger Waters appeared in the concert performing his own song "Flickering Flame", also with Jon Carin on keys, but did not take part in either song with the members of Pink Floyd.

In 2020, the live recording of "Arnold Layne" from this concert was released as a single for Record Store Day.

Backing musicians
See: Pink Floyd live backing musicians

Because of the increasingly complex nature of Pink Floyd's music, more and more musicians besides the band were required on stage to recreate sounds achieved in the studio. Some performances of Atom Heart Mother featured an entire orchestra and choir, reputedly a nightmare to bring on tour. Less 'weighty' contributions from other musicians followed. In 1973 Dick Parry provided saxophone for Dark Side of the Moon and reprised this for live performances in every subsequent tour except those promoting The Wall and A Momentary Lapse of Reason, the latter in which Scott Page provided sax. For 1977's Animals promotion, Snowy White was brought in as an additional guitarist. He returned for The Wall shows along with a complete "surrogate band" consisting of Peter Wood (keyboards), Willie Wilson (drums) and Andy Bown (bass). Andy Roberts replaced White for the 1981 shows. For the A Momentary Lapse of Reason and Division Bell tours, Jon Carin (whom David Gilmour had met at Live Aid playing in Bryan Ferry's backing band) provided additional synthesizers and keyboards, Guy Pratt replaced Roger Waters on bass, Tim Renwick provided additional guitar and Gary Wallis additional percussion. Several backing vocalists, (the most notable of whom are Rachel Fury, Clare Torry, Sam Brown, Margaret Taylor, Durga McBroom and Carol Kenyon) have accompanied the band on and off from Dark Side of the Moon onwards. During their performance at Live 8, Pink Floyd used Tim Renwick, Jon Carin, Dick Parry and Carol Kenyon.

Notes

References
 Fitch, Vernon. The Pink Floyd Encyclopedia, 2005, 
 Mason, Nick. Inside Out: A Personal History of Pink Floyd, 2004. 
 Schaffner, Nicholas. Saucerful of Secrets: The Pink Floyd Odyssey, 1991. 
 Povey, Glenn and Russell, Ian. Pink Floyd: In The Flesh: the complete performance history, 1997. 
 Scarfe, Gerald. "The Making of Pink Floyd: The Wall", 2010.

External links
 Mark Fisher's Pink Floyd gallery

Pink Floyd concert tours
Concerts